Mundrabilla may refer to:

 Mundrabilla, Western Australia
 Mundrabilla Land District

See also
 Mundrabilla (meteorite), large meteorite found in Australia